The Bagalini Colombo is an Italian homebuilt aircraft that was designed by Marino Bagalini. The aircraft is supplied in the form of plans for amateur construction.

Design and development
The Colombo features a strut-braced parasol wing, a two-seats in side-by-side configuration open cockpit with a windshield, fixed conventional landing gear, or optional tricycle landing gear, and a single engine in tractor configuration.

The aircraft is made from wood and metal, with its flying surfaces covered in doped aircraft fabric. Its  span wing employs an RSG 35 airfoil at the wing root, transitioning to an RSG 36 airfoil at the wing tip. The standard engine used is the  Rotax 447 two-stroke powerplant.

The manufacturer estimates construction time from the supplied kit to be 700 hours.

Specifications (Colombo)

References

External links
Photo of a Colombo
Photo of a Colombo

Colombo
1990s Italian sport aircraft
1990s Italian ultralight aircraft
Single-engined tractor aircraft
Parasol-wing aircraft
Homebuilt aircraft